Tanglewood National Golf Club is a public golf course located in Bainbridge Township, Geauga County, Ohio within the Tanglewood Lake housing development.  

Formerly known as Tanglewood Country Club which was a private country club, the club went into receivership in 2007 after  the  Tanglewood Tr. road to the club was closed for 3 years destroying the business. 

On June 6, 2009, Tanglewood Country Club was purchased at auction by Marc Strauss for $950,000 - less than half of its appraised value and Tanglewood National Golf Club as of July 1, 2009.

Tanglewood National Golf Club is currently in the process of being sold to the Tanglewood Lake residents.

The golf course

The 18 hole championship golf course was built by William F. Mitchell, a  regarded member of the American Society of Golf Course Architects in 1966 and opened in 1967.

Course record: 67 - Jubal Jerik

With a 144 slope rating, Tanglewood is the former number one slope rated course in Northeastern Ohio.
Tanglewood has hosted major golf tournaments, among them the PGA Tour's last Cleveland Open, in 1972, the LPGA Babe Zaharias Classic and the Ohio Open.

Fuzzy Zoeller, U.S. Open winner and professional golfer, said that Tanglewood could be a U.S. Open course. "Set the tees on the blues, grow the rough and you've got an open course".

In 1972, Tanglewood Country Club hosted the PGA's Cleveland Open.  The Winner: David Graham SCORE: -6 (68, 73, 68, 69 = 278) PRIZE: $30,000.00.  Graham won on the second hole of a sudden death playoff with Bruce Devlin.

Tanglewood scorecard

Greens: Bent Grass
Fairways: Bent Grass

Owners 
Dennis Romanini 1981-2008
Huntington Bank 2008-2009
Marc Strauss 2009-2012
Tanglewood Lake Homeowners Association 2012–Present

Head golf professionals 
Mike Limback
Bill Germana
James H. Dale / Assistants: Lenny Vericelli, Jubal Jerik, Mike Kyle, Brian Huff
Jubal A. Jerik / Assistants: Jimmy "Z" Zambataro, Bob Gurley, B.J. Williams
Tony Guerrieri / Assistants: Joe Romanini
Joe Romanini
Matt Baca 2009–present

Bagroom 

The Bagroom was located just below the Golf Shop where the members stored their golf bags.  The Bagroom also housed the towel laundering facility and the range ball storage and cleaning facility.  It was connected to the Cart Barn where the golf carts were housed.  This building is part of phase 3 renovations.

The Pro Shop, now located in the Clubhouse is fully stocked with clubs, apparel (both men's and women's)and accessories.  The snack shop is also located within the Pro Shop with full liquor license.

The clubhouse

The Tanglewood Country Club Clubhouse (27,00 square feet) has gone through a complete renovation.  Phase I which included redesign and replacement of roof, all new windows and doors.  The exterior was refaced with split rock sandstone.  The Porte Cochere has been redesigned to complement the exterior of the building.  Renovations included replacement of flooring throughout, redesign of conference room, addition of 2 new bathrooms, remodel of Main Ballroom (200 guests) West Room (80) guests, for a combination of 300 attendees, the old Pavilion Restaurant will be an additional Ballroom up to 70 guests.  The pool was removed and regraded.  This area will be relandscaped and the parking increased as well as the driving range being enlarged.

Events 

PGA Cleveland Open 1972 aka The PGA "$150,000 Cleveland Open Golf Championship"
LPGA Babe Zaharias Classic
Northern Ohio PGA Jim Garner Memorial Golf Tournament
Ohio Open Golf Championship (1981)
Nestle/Bernie Kosar Charity Classic
Sickle Cell Anemia Golf Outing
Marymont Cavs Charity Golf Classic
Kent State Architects
American Greetings Golf Outing
Cousins Cigar Outing
Tiffany's Cabaret Golf Outing
NFL Alumni Golf Outing
Urban League of Cleveland
Vincent Federico Memorial Outing
1st Annual Tanglewood Country Club Memorial Tournament - June 12, 2009
3rd Annual Tanglewood Country Club Memorial Tournament * (2nd Annual TCCM was played off-site due to poor course conditions).

Member events

References

External links
 

Golf clubs and courses in Ohio
Buildings and structures in Geauga County, Ohio
Tourist attractions in Geauga County, Ohio
Sports venues completed in 1967
1967 establishments in Ohio